Hale is an unincorporated community in Yuma County, Colorado, United States located along US 36.  The U.S. Post Office at Idalia (ZIP Code 80735) now serves Hale postal addresses.

Geography
Hale is located at  (39.630548,-102.143497).

References

Unincorporated communities in Yuma County, Colorado
Unincorporated communities in Colorado